Brunetti is a surname and may refer to:

People
 Antonio Brunetti (1744–1786), Italian violinist
 Argentina Brunetti (1907–2005), Argentine actress and writer
 August Brunetti-Pisano (1870–1943), Austrian composer
 Dana Brunetti (born 1973), Co-Founder and Chief Content Officer of Cavalry Media
 Dominic Brunetti (born 1977), American politician
 Enrico Brunetti (1862–1927), British musician and entomologist
 Erik Brunetti (born 1967), American designer and founder of the clothing brand FUCT
 Federica Brunetti (born 1988), Italian professional basketball player
 Gaetano Brunetti (1744–1798), prolific Italian composer
 Gianluca Brunetti (born 1962), Italian Secretary General of the European Economic and Social Committee
 Giovan Gualberto Brunetti (1706-1787), Italian composer
 Ivan Brunetti (born 1967), Italian-American cartoonist
 Lodovico Brunetti (1813–1899), Italian inventor of the first modern crematory (1873)
 Mara Brunetti (born 1976), Italian former synchronized swimmer 
 Melvin T. Brunetti (1933-2009), U.S. judge, Court of Appeals for the Ninth Circuit
 Octavio Brunetti (1975–2014), Argentine pianist
 Orazio Brunetti (XVII century), Italian engraver and painter, active mainly in Rome
 Sebastiano Brunetti (died 1649), Italian painter active in his native Bologna
 Susana Brunetti (born 1941), Argentine actress
 Therese Brunetti née Frey (1782-1864), Czech stage actor and ballet dancer

Fictional entities
 Commissario Guido Brunetti, protagonist of Donna Leon's series of crime novels set in Venice, Italy and his family

See also
 Bruni (disambiguation)
 Iancu v. Brunetti, pending U.S. Supreme Court case on the registration of trademarks
 

Italian-language surnames